Design News is a monthly US trade publication published by UBM Electronics, a division of United Business Media. Design News serves the information needs of the field of design engineering.

The editorial director is William Ng, with the editorial offices located in New York City.

History and profile
Established in 1946, Design News magazine is published 12 times per year. Each issue addresses system and product design issues related to automation & control, materials science & assembly, hardware and software design tools, and electronics/ and electronic test equipment.

Common topics include CAD, design engineering, consumer electronics, and automation.

As of December 2014, the total BPA audited circulation is 96,667 subscribers.

Former owner Reed Business Information sold the magazine to Canon Communications in February 2010 and became part of UBM Electronics after United Business Media's purchase of Canon Communications in November 2010. Design News now publishes a digital edition, based on the DeusM Community in a Box platform.

References

BPA Worldwide

External links
 Design News website

Business magazines published in the United States
Monthly magazines published in the United States
Design magazines
Magazines established in 1946
Magazines published in California
Professional and trade magazines
Informa brands